Lac de Pierre-Percée is a lake in Pierre-Percée, Meurthe-et-Moselle, France. At an elevation of 380 m, its surface area is 3.04 km².

Pierre Percee
Landforms of Meurthe-et-Moselle